WSJU may refer to:

 WSJU-LD, a low-power television station (channel 32) licensed to serve Ceiba, Puerto Rico
 WSJU-TV, a defunct television station (channel 31) formerly licensed to serve San Juan, Puerto Rico